Minuscule 748 (in the Gregory-Aland numbering), ε1203 (von Soden), is a Greek minuscule manuscript of the New Testament written on parchment. Palaeographically it has been assigned to the 12th century. The manuscript has no complex contents. Scrivener labelled it as 758e.

Description 

The codex contains a complete text of the four Gospels on 278 parchment leaves (size ), with numerous lacunae. The leaves are arranged in octavo (eight leaves in quire). The text is written in one column per page, 19 lines per page.

 Contents
Matthew 7:25-8:28; 12:36-13:8; 13:38-28:20; Mark 1:1-6:1; 6:10-7:22; 7:23-16:20; Luke 1:1-3:18; 3:34-8:53; 9:9-16:11; 16:21-23:49; 24:6-53; John 1:1-15:6; 16:19-18:18; 18:38-19:29.

There is also another division according to the smaller Ammonian Sections (in Mark 237 sections, last numbered sections ends in 16:15), without references to the Eusebian Canons.

Text 

The Greek text of the codex is a representative of the Byzantine text-type. Aland placed it in Category V.

Hermann von Soden classified it to the textual family Ir. According to the Claremont Profile Method it belongs to the textual cluster 686.

History 

Scrivener and Gregory dated the manuscript to the 12th century. The manuscript is currently dated by the INTF to the 12th century.

It was added to the list of New Testament manuscripts by Scrivener (758) and Gregory (748). Gregory saw the manuscript in 1885.

The manuscript is now housed at the Bibliothèque nationale de France (Suppl. Gr. 903) in Paris.

See also 

 List of New Testament minuscules
 Biblical manuscript
 Textual criticism
 Minuscule 747

References

Further reading 

 

Greek New Testament minuscules
12th-century biblical manuscripts
Bibliothèque nationale de France collections